Marc Fischbach (born 22 February 1946) is a Luxembourgish politician belonging to the Christian Social People's Party.  From 1979 until 1984, Fischbach was a Member of the European Parliament.  He served as Minister for Defence and Minister for the Police Force between 20 July 1984 and 14 July 1989, before transferring to become Minister for Justice until 30 January 1998, when he resigned from the government.

He is the son of fellow CSV politician Marcel Fischbach, who had also served as Minister for Defence (1964–1967).

References

|-

|-

1946 births
Living people
Ministers for Defence of Luxembourg
Ministers for the Police Force of Luxembourg
Ministers for Justice of Luxembourg
Christian Social People's Party politicians
People from Luxembourg City
Christian Social People's Party MEPs
MEPs for Luxembourg 1979–1984
Ministers for Agriculture of Luxembourg